Woodianthus is a genus of flowering plants belonging to the family Malvaceae.

Its native range is Bolivia.

Species:
 Woodianthus sotoi Krapov.

References

Malvaceae
Malvaceae genera